Tielen Müller, best known as Titi Müller (born September 23, 1986) is a Brazilian blogger, television presenter and actress.

Filmography

Television

Cinema

References

External links
 
 

1986 births
Living people
People from Porto Alegre
Brazilian people of German descent
Brazilian television actresses
Brazilian film actresses
Brazilian television presenters
Brazilian bloggers
Actresses from Rio Grande do Sul
Brazilian women bloggers
Brazilian women television presenters